Drew Barnett Tipton (born 1967) is a United States district judge of the United States District Court for the Southern District of Texas.

Education 

Tipton graduated from Angleton High School, earned his Bachelor of Arts from Texas A&M University, and his Juris Doctor from South Texas College of Law.

Legal career 

After graduating law school, Tipton served as a law clerk to Judge John D. Rainey of the United States District Court for the Southern District of Texas. He previously was in private practice with Marek, Griffin, & Knaupp and Littler Mendelson. From 1999 to 2020, he was part of BakerHostetler's Houston office and became a partner in 2002. His practice focused on complex labor and employment and trade secret litigation.

Military service 

Tipton served in the United States Marine Corps Reserve from 1988 to 1994 as a radio operator for an infantry battalion. He was honorably discharged with the rank of Sergeant.

Federal judicial service 

On January 15, 2020, President Donald Trump announced his intent to nominate Tipton to serve as a United States district judge for the United States District Court for the Southern District of Texas. On February 4, 2020, the nomination was sent to the Senate. Tipton was nominated to the seat vacated by Judge Sim Lake, who assumed senior status on July 5, 2019. A hearing on his nomination before the Senate Judiciary Committee was held on February 12, 2020. On May 14, 2020, the nomination was reported out of committee by a 12–10 vote. On June 3, 2020, the United States Senate invoked cloture on Tipton's nomination by a 53–42 vote. Later that same day, his nomination was confirmed by a 52–41 vote. He received his judicial commission on June 15, 2020.

Notable rulings 

On January 26, 2021, Tipton enjoined an Executive Order issued by President Joe Biden, which halted the deportation of some immigrants for a 100-day period by temporarily blocking the President from overturning the prior administration's immigration policy known as Migrant Protection Protocols (MPP).

On February 23, shortly before the temporary stay expired, Tipton ruled that Biden's executive order pausing deportations for 100 days exceeded presidential authority.

On September 15, a three-judge panel of the U.S. Court of Appeals for the Fifth Circuit ruled Tipton's ruling regarding Biden's executive order was incorrect, disagreeing with his reading of the Illegal Immigration Reform and Immigrant Responsibility Act of 1996 and his disregard for the long-standing tradition of executive procedural authority.  On November 30, 2021, the full Fifth Circuit vacated that three-judge panel's decision, thereby lifting the stay on Tipton's preliminary injunction. On July 21, 2022, the Supreme Court agreed hear the case and left in place Tipton’s ruling striking down the  Biden policy, which means that the Biden administration cannot implement it while it waits for the Supreme Court to hear argument and issue a decision.

Memberships 

He has been a member of the American Legion since 1999. He has been a member of the American Bar Association since 2000. From 2002 to 2008, he was a member of the Republican National Lawyers Association. Since 2003, he has been a member of the Marine Corps Association. Since 2010, he has been a member of the Federalist Society. He has been a member of the Second Baptist Church in Houston, Texas since 2008.

References

External links 
 

1967 births
Living people
20th-century American lawyers
21st-century American lawyers
21st-century American judges
Baptists from Texas
Federalist Society members
Judges of the United States District Court for the Southern District of Texas
People associated with BakerHostetler
People from Angleton, Texas
South Texas College of Law alumni
Texas A&M University alumni
Texas lawyers
Texas Republicans
United States district court judges appointed by Donald Trump
United States Marine Corps reservists